was a Japanese mathematician. He was admitted to the American Mathematical Society in 1966. He was a professor emeritus of Tokyo Metropolitan University and the president of Josai University.

References

Japanese mathematicians
1908 births
2004 deaths